Öküz Mehmet Pasha Complex, alternatively known as Öküz Mehmet Pasha Caravanserai, is a külliye (building complex) in Ulukışla, Turkey. According to Ulukışla municipality page the name Ulukışla refers to the complex. In the past a part of the complex was used as military barracks and the Ulukışla citizens called the complex Ulukışla ("Great barracks") which eventually became the name of the settlement.

Location

History
The commissioner of the complex was Öküz Mehmet Pasha (died in 1619), a grand vizier of the Ottoman Empire. (There is another caravanserai bearing his name in Kuşadası) During his campaign to Safavid dynasty of Persia (modern Iran)  in 1615, he decided to spend the winter in Ulukışla. But he was unable to find adequate barracks for his soldiers and he had to distribute the troops to nearby towns. To solve the problem for the future campaigns  he had the complex built in 1616. According to another theory about the origin of the complex, Ulukışla was the birth place of Öküz Mehmet Pasha and he tried to rebuild his home town.  The complex underwent a renovation in 1753. In 2011 it was restored by the Directorate of Foundations. Presently the complex is used as a market place . Both the governorship and the municipality have offices in the building.

The complex

The complex is situated on a gentle slope from the north. The main building is a rectangular arasta (Ottoman bazaar) situated in west to east direction. North of the bazaar, there is a square-plan courtyard with cloister. The dormitories encircle the courtyard. South of the bazaar there is a hamam (Turkish bath) and a mosque. Originally there was a golden finial in the bath. But it was later stolen. The heated water in the hamam was used to heat the complex. The complex had a sewage system.

In literature
Han Duvarları ("Walls of Caravansarai") is a well-known poem of the renowned Turkish poet Faruk Nafiz Çamlıbel (1898–1973). Çamlıbel wrote this poem in 1925 after his travel from Ulukışla to another city. It is claimed that Çamlıbel was inspired by Öküz Mehmet Pasha Complex.

References

Buildings and structures in Niğde Province
Ulukışla District
Buildings and structures completed in 1616
Caravanserais in Turkey
Buildings and structures of the Ottoman Empire
Ottoman caravanserais
Commercial buildings completed in the 17th century
1616 establishments in the Ottoman Empire